The 1948 Anti-Jewish riots in Tripolitania were riots between the antisemitic rioters and Jewish communities of Tripoli and its surroundings in June 1948, during the British Military Administration in Libya. The events resulted in 13-14 Jews and 4 Arabs dead and destruction of 280 Jewish homes. The events occurred during the 1948 Arab–Israeli War.

Background
The Jews of Libya had already suffered under Italian rule during World War II and shortly after it ended, when the bloody pogrom in Tripoli claimed many Jewish lives three years earlier.

The 1948 Arab–Israeli War had begun a month earlier following the proclamation of the State of Israel, although British-controlled Libya did not take part in the conflict. The proclamation of the State of Israel which began the war had "aroused among the Arabs less interest than was expected" in Tripoli according to the British authorities. However, according to the report of the British Chief Administrator, Tripoli became a transit point for both Tunisian and Algerian volunteers on their way to fight for Egypt, which had just announced no more volunteers would be accepted, as well as "ardent young Zionists" on their way to Israel.

The British Public Information Office also reported "a certain aggressive spirit noticeable lately among the local Jewish youth", noting two incidents the day prior to the riots in which two Arabs were hospitalised after beatings by Jews following street accidents. This combined with the transiting volunteers "possibly provided the fuel for the outbreak which followed".

The riot
The rioting began on 12 June in Tripoli, Libya. This time, unlike the previous Tripoli pogrom, the Jewish community of Tripoli had prepared to defend itself. Jewish self-defense units fought back against the Muslim rioters.

According to the British reports, the rioting broke out spontaneously. The Jewish defense measures had been prepared beforehand, with the British noting signs in Hebrew stating "It is good to die for one's country", and stated that during the riots the role of the Jewish organization "was not purely defence" since "determined parties of young Jews battled with the police in efforts to break out of The Old City in order to attack Arabs". The rioting began with an argument between a Jew and an Arab in central Tripoli, in which other Jews and Arabs joined in. Within half an hour a crowd of Arabs had gathered and made their way towards the Jewish Quarter of Old City (also known as the "Jewish Hara"), armed themselves with sticks and stones, following which Jewish units threw bombs into the crowd. The rioting continued for the next hour, during which Jews on rooftops retaliated, and also attacked the police forces, throwing bombs, stones and small arms fire.

The riots resulted in the death of thirteen or fourteen Jews, four Muslims, with 38 Jews and 51 Muslims being injured, and causing extensive property damage, and leaving approximately 300 families destitute. Jews in the surrounding countryside and in Benghazi were subjected to additional attacks.

Aftermath

In November 1948, a few months after the riots, the American consul in Tripoli Orray Taft Jr. reported that: "There is reason to believe that the Jewish Community has become more aggressive as the result of the Jewish victories in Palestine. There is also reason to believe that the community here is receiving instructions and guidance from the State of Israel. Whether or not the change in attitude is the result of instructions or a progressive aggressiveness is hard to determine. Even with the aggressiveness or perhaps because of it, both Jewish and Arab leaders inform me that the inter-racial relations are better now than they have been for several years and that understanding, tolerance and cooperation are present at any top level meeting between the leaders of the two communities."

The insecurity which arose from anti-Jewish attacks led many Jews to abandon Libya and emigrate. The emigration, which was prompted by the 1945 Tripoli pogrom, had become a refugee "flood" with the ending of the 1948 Arab-Israeli War. From 1948 to 1951, and especially after immigration became legal in 1949, 30,972 Jews moved to Israel, which had gained independence.

See also
History of the Jews in Libya
 1945 Anti-Jewish riots in Tripolitania
 1948 Cairo bombings

Notes

References

Bibliography

Further reading 

The disturbances in Tripoli of 12th June 1948, "An Account issued by the Public Information Office drawn from official and semi-official sources, and the reports of eyewitnesses.", File No: FO 160/98,   Dated: 12 June 1948
Appendix to Police Report on Disorders, Colonel A. Saunders, Commissioner of Police, File No: FO 160/98,   Document ref: S.15/1, 12 June 1948
Personal Observations on Police Action, Colonel A. Saunders, Commissioner of Police,  File No: FO 160/98,   Dated: 19 June 1948
Arab-Jewish Disturbances Tripoli, Brigadier T.R. Blackley, Chief Administrator of the British Military Administration in Tripolitania, File No: FO 160/98,   Document ref: 18/B/16/6,  Dated: 23 June 1948

Mass murder in 1948
Anti-Jewish pogroms by Muslims 1941-49
Anti-Jewish pogroms by Muslims
Antisemitism in Libya
Jewish Libyan history
Ethnic riots
Ethnic cleansing in Africa
Arab–Israeli conflict
1948 Arab–Israeli War
June 1948 events in Africa
1948 riots
Riots and civil disorder in Africa
Massacres in Libya
Massacres in 1948